The Arabic names of the months of the Gregorian calendar are usually phonetic Arabic pronunciations of the corresponding month names used in European languages. An exception is the Syriac calendar used in Iraq and the Levant, whose month names are inherited via Classical Arabic from the Babylonian and Hebrew lunisolar calendars and correspond to roughly the same time of year.

Though the lunar Hijri calendar and solar Hijri calendar are prominent in the Mideast, the Gregorian calendar is and has been used in nearly all the countries of the Arab world, in many places long before European occupation. All Arab states use the Gregorian calendar for civil purposes. The names of the Gregorian months as used in Egypt, Sudan, and Yemen are widely regarded as standard across the Arab world,  although their Classical Arabic names are often used alongside them. In other Arab countries, some modification or actual changes in naming or pronunciation of months are observed.

Iraq and the Levant
These names are used primarily in Iraq, Syria, Jordan, Lebanon and Palestine, as well as by Arab citizens of Israel. Classical Arabic inherited the names from the Babylonian and Hebrew calendars, which are lunisolar.  Although the Arabic names are cognate, they do not refer to the lunar months, as when the names are used in their original Babylonian or Hebrew context (indeed, the names of the Gregorian months in Hebrew are based on the German names of the Gregorian months, rather than the months of the Babylonian and Hebrew Calendars.)  Nine of these names were used in the Ottoman Turkish calendar, of which five remain in use in the modern Turkish calendar.

Egypt, Sudan, and Eastern Arabia 
The names of the Gregorian months in Egypt, Sudan and Eastern Arabia are based on the old Latin names.

Libya (1969–2011)
The names of months used in the Great Socialist People's Libyan Arab Jamahiriya (1977–2011) were derived from various sources, and were assembled after Muammar Gaddafi's seizure of power in 1969 and abolished in 2011 after the 17 February Revolution. The decision of changing calendar names was adopted in June 1986. Although the Libyan calendar followed the same sequence of renamed Gregorian months, it counted the years from the death of the prophet Muhammad. This reckoning was therefore ten years behind the Solar Hijri calendar used in Iran and Afghanistan.

Algeria and Tunisia
The names of the Gregorian months in Algeria and Tunisia are based on the French names of the months, reflecting France's long colonisation of these countries (1830–1962 in Algeria; 1881–1956 in Tunisia).

Morocco
As Morocco was long part of the Roman Empire, the long-standing agricultural Berber calendar of the country preserves the Julian calendar and (in modified form) the names of its months. There are regional variations of the Berber calendar, since some communities did not recognise the Julian 29 February in century years where the Gregorian calendar had no equivalent date.  When Morocco adopted the Gregorian calendar for civil purposes, the names of the months were taken from this local tradition.

See also
 Gregorian calendar
 Islamic calendar
 Solar Hijri calendar
 Assyrian calendar
 Hebrew calendar
 Iranian calendars
 Babylonian calendar
 Pre-Islamic Arabian calendar
 Rumi calendar

References

Cultural conventions
Gregorian calendar
Months
Names of units of time